B. diffusa may refer to:

 Boerhavia diffusa, the tar vine, punarnava or red spiderling, a flowering plant species
 Buddleja diffusa, a plant species endemic to central Peru and northern Argentina

See also 

 List of Latin and Greek words commonly used in systematic names#D